Masahiko Tanaka is the name of:

Masahiko Tanaka (born 1954), Japanese voice actor
Masahiko Tanaka (karateka), Japanese karate master and former world champion
Masahiko Tanaka (baseball), Japanese baseball player